Ahmed Mohieddine Al-Sghaier (born 2 January 1937) is a Tunisian former footballer who played for US Tunisienne and the Tunisian national team.

References

External links 
 
 

1937 births
Living people
Footballers from Tunis
Tunisian footballers
Tunisia international footballers
Olympic footballers of Tunisia
Footballers at the 1960 Summer Olympics
1962 African Cup of Nations players
1963 African Cup of Nations players
Association football defenders